The 2019 Rhythmic Gymnastics European Championships was the 35th edition of the Rhythmic Gymnastics European Championships, which took place on 16–19 May 2019 at the National Gymnastics Arena in Baku, Azerbaijan.

Participating countries

Medal winners

Results

Team

Senior Individual

Hoop

Ball

Clubs

Ribbon

Medal count

References

Rhythmic Gymnastics European Championships
European Rhythmic Gymnastics Championships
International gymnastics competitions hosted by Azerbaijan
Rhythmic Gymnastics European Championships
Sports competitions in Baku
Rhythmic